A teardrop hull is a submarine hull design which emphasizes submerged performance over surfaced performance. It was somewhat commonly used in the early stages of submarine development, but was gradually abandoned in the early 20th century in favour of designs optimized for high performance on the surface as a result of changes in operational doctrine. Although naval doctrine changed, design practices remained until the later parts of World War II when the German Kriegsmarine suffered ever-growing losses of submarines in the Battle of the Atlantic.

In an attempt to combat the growing threat of allied anti-submarine efforts, experimental design concepts dating back to the late interbellum were shoehorned into the existing submarine design process, resulting in a small number of hydrogen peroxide-powered submarines as well as the Elektroboot family of diesel-electric submarine classes. Although too late and too few to turn the war around, examination of these boats in the immediate post-war period heavily disrupted the institutional inertia which had kept the navies of the world focused on the "diving torpedo boat" in the previous decades, and led to an increased focus on submerged performance. This led to the eventual reintroduction of the teardrop hull in submarines, being employed in various forms on virtually all large undersea military vessels today.

History 

Because the term refers not to any exact shape, but rather to the abstract concept of a hull shape optimized for underwater travel, and more specifically the physical manifestation of this idea in actual submarines as limited by material sciences and the design requirements placed upon the vessel, whether or not any specific vessel exhibits a teardrop hull depends on the subjective interpretation of the term itself. Depending on this interpretation, several of the submarines shown below may be considered to have been a "first attempt" or a "milestone" of some description.

In Modern Use 
Although the overarching theme of the teardrop hull is that of maximizing submerged performance at the cost of surfaced performance, the exact outcome of this process depends on several factors, in no specific order as the order of importance of these concerns is in itself variable:

 The size of the submarine, being a function of the requirements placed upon by the designer in terms of operational endurance, weapons capacity and fitted sensors.
 The arrangement of external and internal equipment.
 Economic factors, primarily related to the expensive process of designing, shaping, and assembling hull sections with 3D curves, and then fitting machinery inside.

Single or Double hull 
Starting with the end of WWII, western and eastern submarines were overall similar, being double or partial double-hull designs with large fuel and ballast tanks between the inner and outer hulls as reserving large volumes inside the pressure hulls for the storage of pressure-insensitive fuel was seen as uneconomical. The use of double hulls allows for a large degree of freedom in shaping a boat's exterior and permits room for insensitive equipment to be placed outside the pressure hull, thus allowing a smaller pressure hull and, by extension, a smaller boat. It does however carry with it a high construction and maintenance cost.

Nuclear boats, by virtue of their propulsion system, have little use for this in-between space, and are thus more likely to either use single hulls or, as was the case for soviet submarines, use the "free" space for expanded ballast tanks and equipment. Because of this, western nuclear submarines tend to appear as long tubes closed off by the bow and stern, while eastern nuclear submarines tend to have an overall more hydrodynamically efficient shape and extreme amounts of reserve buoyancy, with some numbers suggesting a reserve buoyancy fraction of >45% for the Project 941 (Shark)-class SSBN. There also exists an option for a hydrodynamically optimized single hull nuclear submarine such as the Skipjack-class, but creating large 3D-curved plates out of thick, high-strength metal remains prohibitively expensive.

Bow Shape 
Apart from the choice between single and double hulls, there are also several choices relating to the placement of sonar equipment, torpedo tubes, and the forward dive planes. In smaller coastal boats, typically with two decks inside the pressure hull, locating the torpedo tubes and torpedo handling room on the lower deck with the sonar mounted higher up in the bow, potentially above the waterline as on German Type 206 and Swedish Sjöormen, Västergötland, and more recent classes, offers easy access to the sonar for maintenance. Another option is to place the torpedo room on the upper deck with the array in the lower half of the bow as on the British Upholder-class and the Soviet/Russian Kilo, with leaves space behind the bow for large battery banks, and may allow easier restocking of torpedoes by loading them through the upper torpedo tubes instead of through a dedicated torpedo loading hatch. Both of these options tend to result in somewhat blunt bows, and the former option may require moving the forward dive planes from the hull up to the sail so as to reduce flow noise that might otherwise disturb the sonar.

As size increases, the greater beam of the boat allows for the use of angled torpedo tubes firing through the sides of the hull while leaving room in the bow for a much larger sonar array. This is the option chosen for many US nuclear submarines since the middle of the cold war, and is also employed on the new Russian Yasen-class boats. As before, the drive to minimize flow noise may encourage moving the forward dive planes to the sail, but this may be a disadvantage when surfacing through the arctic ice, requiring reinforcements and high-angle tilting mechanisms to prevent bending of the planes. A more complex solution is to replicate the German Type XXI by folding the forward dive planes flush into the hull when not in use, preferably using an additional set of doors to cover the opening in the hull sides. A third option commonly used by the British is to simply leave the forward dive planes on the upper part of the bow permanently, occasionally with the ability to fold upward so as to not foul harbour structures, and reshape the bow at the dive plane's point of attachment so as to create the least possible amount of turbulence.

Propulsion and stern control surfaces 
In terms of propulsion, western submarines of this type end in a single propeller so as to minimize drag; the Soviet navy was slower to adopt this practice, their designs continuing to use two propellers to provide either greater power or safety. The Type 206 has a long, fine taper abaft the sail, again to minimize drag, but the British Upholder class has a more economical design, having a short taper at the extreme aft of the hull so as to maximize internal volume, and perhaps provide greater strength to the hull. The German Type VII submarine pictured on this page has the aft of her hull tapering abruptly for this purpose, though its propeller axis follows that of the rest of the hull.

The Albacore studied several positions of the afterplanes. American designers settled on a modified version of the Delphin's cruciform arrangement (a Greek cross viewed from behind); they rejected the alternative of an x-arrangement for its complexity, but it was accepted and used by the Dutch, Swedish, Australian and German navies among others, for its ability to snuggle closer to a shallow seabed without striking the rudder on the sea floor. The Soviets often repeated a conventional arrangement, similar to that of the Type XXI U-boat.

The "Albacore hull" 
On the first of August 1953, the US launched an experimental vessel, Albacore, which featured a hull shape largely based on the "Lyon Shape" named for Hilda Lyon. Following successful maneuvering trials and tests of various rudder and propeller arrangements, the same overall hull shape was used for the Skipjack- and Barbel-classes, and most modern US submarines today use a variation of that shape with a central extended cylinder constituting the main pressure hull. Because of the large amount of attention paid to the Albacore in the time before the dawn of the internet made information on the subject of submarine history more accessible to the general public, it is likely that any design which at all resembles it may be referred to as an "Albacore hull", regardless of whether it was inspired by Albacore, was developed independently at a similar moment in time, or predated Albacore outright.

References

Notes

Bibliography 

Submarine design